Crazy Ex-Girlfriend is an American musical comedy-drama television series, created by Rachel Bloom and Aline Brosh McKenna, that premiered on The CW on October 12, 2015. The series stars Bloom as Rebecca Bunch, a depressed young woman who decides to follow her ex-boyfriend from New York City to West Covina, California in hopes of finding real happiness. Up until episode 38, when Rebecca decided to focus on herself, all episode titles followed the pattern of referring to Rebecca's ex-boyfriend, Josh (Vincent Rodriguez III).

 On April 2, 2018. The CW renewed the series for a fourth season. The final season contained 17 episodes, as well as a concert special filmed at the Orpheum Theatre. The season premiered on October 12, 2018 and ended on April 5, 2019.

Series overview

Episodes

Season 1 (2015–16)

Season 2 (2016–17)

Season 3 (2017–18)

Season 4 (2018–19)

Ratings

Notes

References

External links
 
 

Episodes
Lists of American comedy-drama television series episodes
Lists of American romance television series episodes